The People's Democratic Party (PDP) is a political party in Tonga. It was formed after a split in the Human Rights and Democracy Movement.  The party was founded on 8 April 2005 in 'Atenisi. Teisina Fuko was the first person elected to the party presidency at a meeting on 15 April 2005.

The PDP was legally registered on July 1, 2005, being the first Tongan party to do so.

The party has not won any seats to the Tonga Parliament. It is currently inactive without any candidates or Members of Parliament.

References

Political parties in Tonga
Political parties established in 2005
Main
2005 establishments in Tonga